José Bernardo Alzedo (August 20, 1788December 28, 1878) was a Peruvian composer.

Alzedo was born in Lima, Peru.  He studied music at the Convento de San Agustín and, at 18 years of age, composed the Misa en Re Mayor (Mass in D Major). In 1806 he was Dominican friar, but his behaviour in this religious Order was relaxed.

Alzedo was the winner of an 1821 contest sponsored by General José de San Martín to choose a himno nacional (national anthem) for Peru. This anthem was "Somos libres, seámoslo siempre," to words by José de la Torre Ugarte.

In 1822 Alzedo went to Chile as a soldier in a military band. In Santiago de Chile he left the military and dedicated himself to music. In 1833 he entered the choir of the Cathedral of Santiago. In 1846 he became kapellmeister. He resided in Chile for 40 years, returning to Peru in 1864. He became director of the Peruvian military band and president of the Philharmonic. He spent the last years of his life in Peru. He wrote the book Filosofía Elemental de la Música (Elementary Philosophy of Music) (1869), where he explored the subject of the music of the Quechuas. He composed folk songs, numerous religious works, and military music.

Selected works
"Somos libres, seámoslo siempre", national anthem of Peru
"Himno al 2 de mayo", march
Miserere (1872)
Misa en Re mayor
Misa en Mi bemol
Misa en Fa mayor
"Canción para la Batalla de Ayacucho"
"Pasión para el Domingo de Ramos"
"Pasión para el Viernes Santo"
La Araucana, military overture for orchestra
"La Chicha", "La Cora" and "La Pola", popular songs

References

External links
National Anthem sung by Juan Diego Flórez

1788 births
1878 deaths
Military music composers
Musicians from Lima
Peruvian composers
Peruvian male composers
Romantic composers
National anthem writers
Peruvian expatriates in Chile
19th-century classical composers
19th-century male musicians
19th-century musicians